Makoto Furutani-Seiki is Director of UK Research Centre for Regenerative Medicine and Biochemistry Research Division, University of Bath, UK.

Education 
Furutani-Seiki was educated at the Yamaguchi University School of Medicine, Japan where he was awarded Doctor of Medicine (M.D) in 1985. He completed his postgraduate study at the Department of Immunology, Graduate School of Medicine, University of Tokyo, Japan where he was awarded a Ph.D in Immunology supervised by the late Tomio Tada in 1989.

Career and research 
Furutani-Seiki started his career in 1992, as a postdoc in Janni Nusslein-Volhard's lab at Max-Planck-Institute in Tübingen, he conducted a genome-wide mutagenesis screen using medaka fish as a group leader of the Kondoh Differentiation Signalling ERATO project.

In 2007, he moved to University of Bath, UK, Centre for Regenerative Medicine  as a Medical Research Council Senior Research Fellow and continues his research at Yamaguchi University School of Medicine, Japan.

Furutani-Seiki research study investigates the molecular mechanisms of mechono-homeostasis in which extracellular mechanical cues are integrated with cell differentiation and proliferation to maintain tissue, organ and body form.

As part of his contribution to the field of Science, Furutani-Seiki discovered a single gene whose product is essential for the body and organs to keep their 3D shape and withstand external forces such as gravity. The gene was discovered through the analysis of a medaka fish mutant with a unique flattened phenotype which was identified by the combination of the mutagenesis screen in zebrafish with another screen in medaka fish. His work further investigates the single cell lineage and regionalisation of cell populations during medaka neurulation.

Furutani-Seiki led an international team of researchers from the University of Bath, UK Centre for Regenerative Medicine that identified a gene that helps the body resist gravity and demonstrated what happens when the system goes wrong.

His research contribution covers gravity response, mechanohomeostais, organoid, immunology, cancer, 3D organogenesis, regeneration and developmental genetics; amongst others.

Awards and honours 
Furutani-Seiki is an alumnus of Kavli Frontiers of Science and a member of the editorial board of Regenerative Medicine Research. He's also a Senior Research Fellow UK of the Medical Research Council (MRC). He's also a professional member of the American Association of Cancer Research and the Molecular Biology Society of Japan.

References

External links 
http://www.med.yamaguchi-u.ac.jp/medicine/chair/basic_04.html

Living people
Cancer researchers
Regenerative medicine journals
University of Tokyo alumni
Kumamoto University
Max Planck Institutes researchers
University of Freiburg
University of Bath
Medical Research Council (United Kingdom) people
Year of birth missing (living people)